Henry Tamburin (born 1944) is a gambling author with a background in mathematics and a doctorate in chemistry. He is best known for his book Blackjack: Take the Money and Run which explains basic blackjack strategy, managing a bankroll, side bets and advanced tactics like card counting.

Tamburin is also well known for his prowess as a blackjack player and frequently teaches courses in blackjack across the United States. He has published 700 articles on various casino games from craps to video poker in publications like The Gambler Magazine, Gaming South Magazine, Strictly Slots and Casino Player Magazine. Henry Tamburin never considered himself to be a real blackjack expert though all critics ascribe such a status to him. He had been working as a manager of chemical company (an international one) for 30 years and always loved his work; after being retired he began to devote more time to the game of blackjack and became interested in video poker too.

Tamburin also appeared in a televised blackjack tournament entitled the Ultimate Blackjack Tour, which aired on CBS. He is currently editor and publisher of the Blackjack Insider Newsletter and runs his own website called Smart Gaming.

References

External links 

 Official site

American blackjack players
American gambling writers
American male non-fiction writers
Living people
1944 births